Chunking may mean:

 Chunking (division), an approach for doing simple mathematical division sums, by repeated subtraction
 Chunking (computational linguistics), a method for parsing natural language sentences into partial syntactic structures
 Chunking (computing), a memory allocation or message transmission procedure or data splitting procedure in computer programming
 Chunking (music), a rhythm guitar and mandolin technique
 Chunking (psychology), a short-term memory mechanism and techniques to exploit it
 Chunking (writing), a method of splitting content into short, easily scannable elements, especially for web audiences
 CHUNKING, an extension method of the Simple Mail Transfer Protocol for delivering electronic mail in computer networking
 Pumpkin chunking, the activity of hurling pumpkins

See also
 Chongqing (disambiguation), which includes its variants Chungking and Chung King, both common variant spellings of this word
 Chun King